An alkali sink is a salty basin land form.  In these depressions, which are found only in the San Joaquin Valley, California, rainwater drains to the basin and collects in areas where it cannot penetrate the soil due to a hard layer of clay or caliche, producing a pond or lake.  When the water evaporates, it leaves behind increasing amounts of salt and minerals in the soil, creating a hi pH level in the water and soil.  

The term may also refer to a North American desert vegetation type (biome) characteristic of that landform.  Plants that tolerate the extreme salt concentrations are known as halophytes. It is generally below the saltbrush scrub vegetation type, which is typified by less salt tolerant species than alkali sink types.

Halophytes that grow in and around alkali sinks:

 Iodine Bush - Allenrolfea occidentalis
 Bush Seepweed / Inkweed - Suaeda moquinii
 Desert Saltgrass - Distichlis spicata
 Alkali Weed - Cressa truxillensis
 Alkali Heath - Frankenia salina
 Parish's Glasswort - Arthrocnemum
 Spikeweed / Tarweed - Centromadia pungens

References

Fluvial landforms
Salt flats
Salt flats of the United States
Deserts and xeric shrublands
Deserts and xeric shrublands in the United States
.
.
Plant communities of California